Anopheles maculipennis is a species of mosquito that can be found mostly in Europe except New Zealand; it is a main vector of malaria.

References 

Insects described in 1818
maculipennis